The GT46C is a model of diesel-electric locomotive designed and built by Clyde Engineering using Electro-Motive Diesel components. A number of Australian rail freight operators purchased them from 1997: Westrail as the Q class, FreightLink as the FQ class, and Freight Australia as the single-locomotive V class. , all 24 locomotives were owned by Aurizon following its purchase of certain One Rail Australia assets in July 2022.

By operator

Westrail
In May 1996, Westrail ordered 15 GT46Cs from Clyde Engineering as part of an order that also included nine narrow gauge S class locomotives. The order was later extended to 19. All were assembled at a facility established by Clyde Engineering within Westrail's Forrestfield Depot to fulfill the contract with components manufactured at Clyde's Kelso and Somerton plants. All were included in the sale of Westrail to Australian Railroad Group in December 2000 and again to QR National in June 2006. Initially numbered as the Q class, they were later reclassified as the 4000 class.

Freight Australia
Following the destruction of two G class locomotives in 1999, Freight Australia ordered a single GT46AC from EDI Rail who had purchased Clyde Engineering. It was built at their Cardiff Locomotive Workshops in 2002. Numbered V544, it was named after Deputy Prime Minister Tim Fischer. It was included in the sale of the business to Pacific National in February 2004. The locomotive initially operated interstate freight duties, primarily the SCT Logistics service from Melbourne to Perth. In late 2007, it moved to haul Leigh Creek to Port Augusta coal trains in South Australia, servicing the Playford B and Northern power stations. As of March 2014, V544 has been stored at Port Augusta workshops after a major engine failure. In May 2021, it was sold to One Rail Australia and has since been painted into their livery.

FreightLink
In 2003, four were built by EDI Rail at Port Augusta for FreightLink. They were purchased for use on the Adelaide-Darwin railway. The first two units were painted in Indigenous Australian liveries, the other two were in FreightLink red. All were included in the sale of FreightLink to One Rail Australia, and later the sale of ORA to Aurizon.

Summary
Aurizon Q class:
 
Q4001: Aurizon pineapple livery
 
Q4002: Aurizon pineapple livery
 
Q4003: Aurizon Canary livery
 
Q4004: Aurizon Canary livery 
 
Q4005: ARG Orange with black stripes 
 
Q4006: Aurizon pineapple livery
 
Q4007: Aurizon pineapple livery
 
Q4008: Aurizon pineapple livery
 
Q4009: Aurizon pineapple livery 
 
Q4010: ARG yellow with a red stripe
 
Q4011: Aurizon pineapple livery 
 
Q4012: ARG yellow with a red stripe (two panels in the Orange and black livery)
 
Q4013: ARG yellow with a red stripe. The logos missing on both sides 
 
Q4014: Aurizon Canary livery
 
Q4015: ARG yellow with a red stripe 
 
Q4016: Aurizon Canary livery 
 
Q4017: Original Westrail yellow with black stripes 
 
Q4018: Aurizon Canary livery
 
Q4019: Aurizon pineapple livery
 
 
All former ORA units are in their orange and black scheme, though they are now all owned by Aurizon.

Fleet

Related development
 New South Wales 90 class locomotive, ancestor model GT46CWM
 Downer EDI Rail GT46C ACe, derivative model

References

External links

Aurizon diesel locomotives
Clyde Engineering locomotives
Co-Co locomotives
Diesel locomotives of Australia
Diesel locomotives of Western Australia
Railway locomotives introduced in 1997
Standard gauge locomotives of Australia
Diesel-electric locomotives of Australia